Maurice James Lyon (16 January 1931 – 16 December 2014) was an Australian rules footballer who played with South Melbourne in the Victorian Football League (VFL).

His son, Ross played football for Fitzroy and Brisbane Bears and coached St Kilda and Fremantle.

Notes

External links 

2014 deaths
1931 births
Australian rules footballers from Victoria (Australia)
Sydney Swans players